Tambatitanis (meaning "Tamba giant", after Tamba, the name given to the northwest of Kansai, Japan is an extinct genus of titanosauriform dinosaur from the Early Cretaceous (probably early Albian) of Japan. It is known from a single type species, Tambatitanis amicitiae, which is known from the Sasayama Group. It was a basal titanosauriform and possibly belonged to the Euhelopodidae. The holotype was collected between 2006 and 2010.

References

Early Cretaceous dinosaurs of Asia
Fossil taxa described in 2014
Fossils of Japan